This list of museums in South Dakota encompasses museums defined for this context as institutions (including nonprofit organizations, government entities, and private businesses) that collect and care for objects of cultural, artistic, scientific, or historical interest and make their collections or related exhibits available for public viewing. Museums that exist only in cyberspace (i.e., virtual museums) are not included.

Museums

Defunct museums
 
 McCook County Museum, Salem
 Performance Auto Museum, Sioux Falls and Deadwood
 Soukup and Thomas International Balloon and Airship Museum, Mitchell, closed in 2000

See also

Nature Centers in South Dakota

References

Resources
Association of South Dakota Museums

Museums
South Dakota
Museums